Paul Boujenah, is a French-Tunisian film director.

He is the brother of Michel Boujenah and the uncle of siblings Matthieu Boujenah and Lucie Boujenah.

Selected filmography

External links
 

Tunisian film directors
Living people
Year of birth missing (living people)